Spain competed at the 1972 Summer Olympics in Munich, West Germany. 123 competitors, 118 men and 5 women, took part in 59 events in 17 sports.

Medalists

Archery

In the first modern archery competition at the Olympics, Spain entered one man and one woman. Their highest placing competitor was Maria Teresa Romero, at 13th place in the women's competition.

Men's Individual Competition:
Emilio Ramos — 2199 points (→ 49th place)

Women's Individual Competition:
Maria Teresa Romero — 2347 points (→ 13th place)

Athletics

Men's 800 metres
Manuel Gayoso
 Heat — 1:47.5
 Semifinals — 1:47.7 (→ did not advance)

Antonio Fernández
 Heat — DNS (→ did not advance)

Men's 4 × 100 m Relay
José Luis Sánchez Paraíso, Manuel Carballo, Francesco García, and Luis Sarría
 Heat — DNF (→ did not advance)

Men's Marathon
Agustín Fernández — 2:27.24 (→ 39th place)
Carlos Pérez — 2:33.22 (→ 50th place)

Basketball

Men's Team Competition
Preliminary Round (Group A):
 Spain — Australia 79-74
 Spain — Cuba 53-74
 Spain — Brazil 69-72
 Spain — Egypt 72-58
 Spain — Japan 87-76
 Spain — United States 56-72
 Spain — Czechoslovakia 70-74

Classification Round:
 9th-12th place: Spain — Poland 76-87
 11th-12th place: Spain — West Germany 84-83 → 11th place

Team Roster
 Carmelo Cabrera
 Clifford Luyk
 Enrique Margall
 Francisco Buscato
 Gonzalo Sagi-Vela
 Jesús Iradier
 Juan Antonio Corbalán
 Luis Miguel Santillana
 Miguel Ángel Estrada
 Rafael Rullán
 Vicente Ramos
 Wayne Brabender

Boxing

Men's Flyweight (– 51 kg)
 Antonio García
 First Round — Bye
 Second Round — Lost to Niamdash Batsuren (MGL), 1:4

Canoeing

Cycling

Eight cyclists represented Spain in 1972.

Individual road race
 Jaime Huélamo — 3rd place, but disqualified after failing a doping test
 Francisco Elorriaga — 16th place
 José Viejo — 37th place
 Tomás Nistal — 54th place

 Team time trial
 Jaime Huélamo
 Carlos Melero
 José Teña
 José Viejo

 Sprint
 Félix Suárez

 Individual pursuit
 Miguel Espinós

Diving

Men's 10m Platform
Jorge Head — 243.27 points (→ 34th place)

Women's 10m Platform
Carmen Nunez — 157.95 points (→ 25th place)

Equestrianism

Gymnastics

Handball

Men's Team Competition
Spain lost all three of its first-round games, to West Germany, Romania, and Norway. The fourth-place finish put Spain into the thirteenth- to sixteenth-place consolation round, where they lost their game against the United States to set up a fifteenth and sixteenth place match against Tunisia. Spain won this game, 23-20.

Preliminary Round (Group C):
 Spain — West Germany 10-13
 Spain — Romania 12-15
 Spain — Norway 17-19
Classification Round:
 13th-16th place: Spain — United States 20-22
 15th-16th place: Spain — Tunisia 23-20 → 15th place

Team Roster
 Antonio Andreu
 Fernando de Andrés
 Francisco López
 Javier García
 Jesús Guerrero
 José Faustino Villamarín
 José Manuel Taure
 José Perramón
 José Rochel
 Juan Antonio Medina
 Juan Miguel Igartua
 Juan Morera
 Miguel Ángel Cascallana
 Santos Labaca
 Vicente Ortega

Hockey

Men's Team Competition
Preliminary Round (Group A):
 Spain — Argentina 1-1
 Spain — Pakistan 1-1
 Spain — Malaysia 0-0
 Spain — Belgium 1-0
 Spain — France 3-2
 Spain — West Germany 1-2
 Spain — Uganda 2-2

Classification Round:
 5th-8th place: Spain — Great Britain 0-2
 7th-8th place: Spain — Malaysia 2-1 → 7th place

Team Roster
 Agustín Churruca
 Antonio Nogués
 Francisco Amat
 Francisco Fábregas
 Francisco Segura
 Jaime Amat
 Jaime Arbós
 Jorge Fábregas
 Jorge Camiña
 José Alustiza
 José Borrell
 José Sallés
 Juan Amat
 Juan Arbós
 Juan Quintana
 Luis Alberto Carrera
 Luis Twose
 Ramón Quintana

Judo

Sailing

Shooting

Nine male shooters represented Spain in 1972.
Open

Swimming

Men's 100m Freestyle
Jorge Comas
 Heat — 53.70s
 Semifinals — 53.92s (→ did not advance)

Men's 4 × 100 m Freestyle Relay
Jorge Comas, Antonio Culebras, Enrique Melo, and José Pujol
 Heat — 3:38.77
 Final — 3:38.21 (→ 8th place)

Water polo

Men's Team Competition
Preliminary Round (Group C):
 Spain — Japan 6-4
 Spain — Italy 2-6
 Spain — Soviet Union 5-8
 Spain — Bulgaria 6-4
Second Round (Group II):
 Spain — Romania 4-7
 Spain — Australia 8-4
 Spain — Cuba 3-4
 Spain — Netherlands 5-7 → 10th place

Team Roster
 Alfonso Cánovas
 Enrique Guardia
 Gabriel Soler
 Gaspar Ventura
 Joan Sans
 José Padrós
 Juan Jané
 Juan Rubio
 Luis Bestit
 Poncio Puigdevall
 Salvador Franch

Weightlifting

References

External links
 Spanish Olympic Committee

Nations at the 1972 Summer Olympics
Olympics
1972 Summer Olympics